The Buffalo Stampede was a basketball team in the Atlantic Coast Professional Basketball League (ACPBL) that started as a franchise in the Premier Basketball League (PBL) in the 2009 season. The team was originally the NexxNow Buffalo Dragons (called Buffalo Dragons in shorthand)   The team was first owned by NexxNow Inc.  However, Vincent Lesh, the owner of the modern American Basketball Association Buffalo Sharks (the team formerly known as the Silverbacks and Rapids) folded that club, left the ABA, and bought the Dragons from NexxNow, renaming them the Buffalo Stampede.

The team was to play their home games at the Burt Flickinger Center at Erie Community College, however with Lesh's purchase they moved to what was going to be the Sharks venue, the Koessler Athletic Center at Canisius College.  On December 15, the team announced that head coach Richard Jacob stepped down and would be replaced on an interim basis by General Manager Roosevelt Bouie.  On December 23, John Fitzpatrick was named head coach.  On March 22, 2009, Fitzpatrick was removed as assistant coach Aaron Clark would take over

running the team for its final two games, before leaving for the Rochester razorsharks the following season. For 2010, Lesh hired Jim Condill as the head coach of the Buffalo Stampede. In February 2010, Condill resigned and Vern Hall, his assistant coach, took over. During the 2010 season Vern Hall was unable to attended two games in Canada on the Stampede's schedule, due to personal reasons. Assistant coach/Team manager Jordan Ellis interimed for Hall and ended up with a 1-1 record on the trip. Becoming the youngest coach in PBL history to ever record a win at the age of 21.

On May 24, 2010, the PBL announced that the league was severing ties with the Stampede.  On August 10, 2010 the Stampede announced their move to the ACPBL and a pending change in venue to Daemen College.

After playing one season in the ACPBL, the Stampede folded, their place in the ACPBL being taken by a team called the Buffalo Warriors.

References

External links
Buffalo Stampede official website

Former Premier Basketball League teams
Former American Professional Basketball League teams
Sports in Buffalo, New York
Basketball teams in New York (state)